Sana may refer to:

Places
 Sanaa, the capital of Yemen
 Sana (river), a river in Bosnia and Herzegovina
 Sana, Bhutan, a town in Bhutan
 Sana, Haute-Garonne, a commune in France
 Sana, Iran, a village in Iran
 Sana, Mali, a commune in Mali
 Saña District, in Peru

People
 Alizata Sana or Adiza Sanoussi, Burkinabé novelist
 André Sana (1920–2013), Iraqi Catholic hierarch
 Ayako Sana (born 1985), Japanese volleyball player
 Ayesha Sana (born 1972), Pakistani TV actress
 Eléonor Sana (born 1997), Belgian skier
 Jimmy De Sana (1949–1990), American artist
 Mama Sana (1900–1997), Malagasy singer and zither player
 Shanoor Sana (born 1971), Indian actress and model
 Tobias Sana (born 1989), Swedish footballer 
 Sanna Ejaz or Sana Ijaz, Pakistani-Pashtun human rights activist
 Sana Fakhar or Sana or Sana Nawaz (born 1979), Pakistani film actress and model
 Sana Khan or Sana Khaan (born 1988), Indian actress, model and dancer
 Sana Takeda (born 1977), Japanese illustrator
 Sana (singer) (born 1996), Japanese singer in South Korean girl group Twice

Other uses 
 Sana (margarine brand), a Turkish spread
 Syrian Arab News Agency, the official Syrian news agency
 Società Anonima Navigazione Aerea (SANA), an Italian airline active 1926–1934
 Operation Sana, a 1995 military offensive in Bosnia
 Sana Commerce, an e-commerce company
 Sana Kurata, a character in manga series Kodomo no Omocha
 RTV Sana, a Bosnian television channel
 Yugo Sana, a budget compact car

See also
 Sanaa (disambiguation)

Japanese-language surnames
Japanese feminine given names